Panama competed at the 2019 Pan American Games in Lima, Peru from July 26 to August 11, 2019.

A total of 84 athletes (46 men and 38 women) were named to the Panamanian team, marking the largest delegation the country has ever sent to the Pan American Games.

On July 5, 2019, athlete Alonso Edward was named as the country's flag bearer during the opening ceremony. However, it was later announced taekwondo athlete Carolena Carstens would carry the flag, as Edward would not be in Lima for the opening ceremony.

Panama won four medals at these edition of the games, ranking 28th overall. The four medals marked the most won at a single edition of the games for the country since 1987.

Competitors
The following is the list of number of competitors (per gender) participating at the games per sport/discipline.

Medalists
The following competitors from Panama won medals at the games. In the by discipline sections below, medalists' names are bolded.

|  style="text-align:left; vertical-align:top;"|

|  style="text-align:left; width:22%; vertical-align:top;"|

Athletics (track and field)

Panama qualified eight track and field athletes (three men and five women).

Key
Note–Ranks given for track events are for the entire round
Q = Qualified for the next round
q = Qualified for the next round as a fastest loser
SB = Seasonal best
DNF = Did not finish

Track and road events

Field events
Women

Badminton

Panama qualified a team of two badminton athletes (one per gender).

Bowling

Boxing

Panama qualified two boxers (one man and one woman).

Cycling

Panama received a reallocated quota for a male road cyclist.

Road
Men

Fencing

Panama qualified one female fencer in the sabre discipline.

Women

Football

Panama qualified a men's and women's team, and each will consist of 18 athletes, for a total of 36.

Men's tournament

Panama's men's team qualified by being the top ranked team from the Central American region at the 2018 CONCACAF U-20 Championship.

Roster
Head coach: Julio Dely Valdés

Three overage players were named on 11 July 2019. The 18-man squad was announced on 13 July 2019. Midfielder Justin Simons was replaced by Maikell Díaz.

Group A

Women's tournament

Panama's women's team qualified by being the top ranked team from the Central American region at the 2018 CONCACAF Women's Championship.

Roster
Head coach: Victor Daniel Suarez

The following players were called-up.

Group B

Golf

Panama qualified a full team of four golfers (two men and two women). However, only three golfers were entered.

Judo

Panama qualified four judoka (two men and two women).

Karate

Panama qualified two karatekas (one per gender).

Kata
Men

Kumite
Women

Modern Pentathlon

Panama qualified one male modern pentathlete.

Men

Shooting

Panama qualified five male sport shooters.

Men

Surfing

Panama received a reallocated spot for one female surfer in the sport's debut at the Pan American Games.

Women

Swimming

Panama qualified nine swimmers (four men and five women).

Men

Women

Mixed

Taekwondo

Panama received one wildcard in the women's 57 kg event.

Kyorugi
Women

Triathlon

Panama qualified two male triathletes.

Men

Weightlifting

Panama qualified two male weightlifters and received a reallocated spot for a female lifter.

Wrestling

Panama received one wild card in the Greco-Roman discipline.

Men

Non-competing sports

Equestrian

Panama qualified one athlete in equestrian jumping. However, no athlete from Panama competed.

Gymnastics

Panama qualified one female artistic gymnast. However, no gymnast from the country competed.

See also
Panama at the 2020 Summer Olympics

References

Nations at the 2019 Pan American Games
2019
2019 in Panamanian sport